Fred Ludwig Rexer, Jr. (November 30, 1946 - August 27, 2021) was a U.S. Army Vietnam combat veteran and Hollywood actor and screenwriter.

Biography
He was best known as the military advisor for Apocalypse Now and as Spiritual Advisor for Conan the Barbarian. (Rexor, the Ben Davidson character in Conan, was named after Fred.) In the opening scenes of Red Dawn, he played the paratroop commander, and later the knife-wielding Russian tank commander gunned down at the service station. Rexer contributed numerous passages to the screenplay of that film and other films written or directed by John Milius and Walter Hill. Milius has named Rexer as the real-life prototype of Captain Willard, the protagonist of Apocalypse Now. Rexer was a federally licensed machine gun dealer, who held a Class 3 Dealer's license from the BATFE (of the U.S. Dept. of the Treasury at the time), selling items listed under the National Firearms Act of 1934, from his Texas business, and he engaged in that business through at least through the 1970s.

Rexer died August 27, 2021, in Texas. His obituary cited the following military service: 38 months in Vietnam from 1965 to 1968, including two tours with the 5th Special Forces Group (Airborne), as well as a tour with the 120th Assault Helicopter Company (AHC), "Razorbacks." His awards included the Silver Star, Distinguished Flying Cross, Bronze Star with Valor and oak leaf cluster, 21 Air Medals, and 6 Purple Hearts.

Publications
Fred L. Rexer, Jr., Machine Guns: Silencers and Counterinsurgency Weapons, Illustrated Catalogs & Reference Guides Nos. 1, 2, and 3, Houston, TX, 1974
Fred L. Rexer, Jr., Submachine Guns, Calibre 9mm & .45 ACP, Ingram M10 , Houston, TX: Anubis Press, 1977
Fred L. Rexer, Jr., Dead or Alive: A Textbook on Self-Defense with the .45 Automatic, Houston, TX: IDHAC Publishing, 1977
Fred L. Rexer, Jr., Brass Knuckle Bible: A Manual of Concealed Weapons, Shreveport, LA: Delta Press, 1978
Fred L. Rexer, Jr., Bridge City, Shreveport, LA: Delta Press, 1978
Fred L. Rexer, Jr., U.S.A. The Urban Survival Arsenal, Shreveport, LA: Delta Press, 1980
Richard Dobbins, Evan Slawson, Deric Washburn, and Harry Kleiner (screenplay); John Milius, Fred Rexer (story), Extreme Prejudice, Pocket Books, New York NY, 1987,

References

External links

 A personal tribute to Fred Rexer, explaining and quoting his tactical and cinematic contributions
Gunship Mission by John A. Cash in Seven Firefights in Vietnam , Office of the Chief of Military History - an account that illustrates some of the methods used by the gunship fire teams, featuring Fred Rexer

1946 births
2021 deaths
United States Army personnel of the Vietnam War
American male film actors
United States Army soldiers